Qualification matches for the 2008 European Men's Handball Championship took place in 2007. According to the EHF rules  host (Norway), and the top six nations from the 2006 European Championship (France, Croatia, Spain, Denmark, Germany, Russia) were automatically qualified. The other nine places will be determined in play-offs in June; nine teams are seeded after qualifying for the 2006 Championship, while their opponents qualified through the preliminary group stages.

Summary
Below is a table containing all seven qualifying groups. Teams that have secured a place in the final tournament are highlighted in green. The order of teams is by play off position.

Group stage
Final standings (as of 30 January 2007)

Group 1

Group 2

Group 3

Group 4

Group 5

Group 6

Group 7

Play-off
The play-off draw was made in Vienna on 26 January 2007. The matches were two-legged affairs, and were played in the second and third weekends of June.

|}

Europe Men's Championship qualification
Europe Men's Championship qualification
qualification
International handball competitions hosted by Austria
Qualification for handball competitions
Europe Men's Championship qualification
Europe Men's Championship qualification